The Crying Game is a 1968 novel by British novelist John Braine. It is a satirical story about a conservative journalist whose life changes after he learns of a political scandal.

It has no connection with the film of the same name.

1968 British novels
British political novels
Novels about journalists
Eyre & Spottiswoode books
Novels by John Braine